Lukyanov (sometimes romanized as Loukianoff) is a Russian masculine surname, its feminine counterpart is Lukyanova. The surname is derived from the male given name Lukyan and literally means Lukyan's. It may refer to:

 Aleksandr Lukyanov (born 1949), Russian rower
 Anatoly Lukyanov (1930–2019), Russian and Soviet politician
 Dmitry Lukyanov (born 1993), Kazakhstani racing cyclist
 Ivan Lukyanov (disambiguation)
 Sergei Lukyanov (1910—1965), Soviet film and theater actor
 Valeria Lukyanova (born 1985), Ukrainian model and entertainer
 Vladimir Lukyanov (born 1945), Russian architect, painter and graphic artist

Russian-language surnames